Ernest Michael Looch (born 21 April 1975) is a South African cricketer and businessman. He played in three first-class matches for Boland in 1998/99. He graduated with a master's degree in accounting, before moving to London temporarily, until returning to South Africa to found Equitable BEE Solutions Ltd in 2003.

See also
 List of Boland representative cricketers

References

External links
 
Ernest Michael Looch at Bayt.com

1975 births
Living people
South African cricketers
Boland cricketers
Cricketers from Pretoria